Henry Forman may refer to:

 Henry Jay Forman, professor of gerontology, and of biochemistry
 Henry James Forman (1879–1966), author
 Harry Buxton Forman (1842–1917), bibliographer and antiquarian bookseller